Marcelo Demoliner and João Souza won the final 6–3, 3–6, [10–7] against Simon Greul and Alessandro Motti.

Seeds

Draw

Draw

References
 Main Draw

Aberto de Tenis do Rio Grande do Sul - Doubles
2012 Doubles